William Carvosso (1750–1834) was an early Wesleyan leader in Cornwall, England. He was converted to Christianity at age 21 and went on to become a Class Leader in the Wesleyan Connexion and a prominent figure of the church. Towards the end of his life he roamed all over Cornwall preaching. He learned to write after he was 65 and wrote a famous memoir, edited by his son  Benjamin Carvosso, filled with his journal and letters.

His grandson Robert Rundle was a notable missionary in Western Canada.

Writings
 William Carvosso: A Memoir, Harvey Christian Publishers  (1996) - see details here

Further reading

 Clara McLeister, Men and Women of Deep Piety, 1920 accessed at Northwest Nazarene University  Feb 12, 2007

1750 births
1834 deaths
People from Paul, Cornwall
British Methodists
Cornish Methodists
Converts to Methodism